Boro Kali Bari is one of the oldest Hindu temples in the city of Mymensingh, Bangladesh. The temple is dedicated to the goddess Kali.

The main festival is Kali Puja, which is celebrated every year. The temple is located 10 minute rickshaw pull from the center of the city. Hindu devotees can visit this temple during morning to night. However, the daily puja usually starts after sunset. Different types of sweets are available to purchase near the Kali temple. Other important Hindu temples in Mymensingh are the Durga Bari in the heart of the city, and the Shiva temple in Thana ghat.

References

Hindu temples in Mymensingh